The Hobart International is a women's professional tennis tournament held at the Hobart International Tennis Centre in Hobart, Australia. The tournament was founded in 1994 as the Tasmanian International Open, it forms a part of the Women's Tennis Association (WTA) Tour and is classed as an International tournament (previously Tier IV). It is competed on outdoor hardcourts, and is held in the run-up to the first Grand Slam tournament of the year, the Australian Open as part of the Australian Open Series.

The tournament is held at the Hobart International Tennis Centre. It was previously sponsored by Moorilla Wines, ANZ and Schweppes. The tournament has played host to a number of top players in the past, such as World #1's Victoria Azarenka, Kim Clijsters, Justine Henin and Serena Williams. Other top players who have participated in the event include Australian Open and Wimbledon semifinalist Zheng Jie, and current/former Top 10 players Jelena Dokić, Alicia Molik, Flavia Pennetta, Chanda Rubin, Patty Schnyder, Samantha Stosur and Vera Zvonareva.

History
In 1893 the Tasmanian Lawn Tennis Championships were established as a combined mens and womens international tennis tournament. In 1969 that tournaments names was changed to the Tasmanian Open Championships, becoming the Tasmanian Open played in Hobart on hard courts in 1978. That tournament ended in 1980. In 1994 this successor event for former womens tournament was revived as the Tasmanian International Open and remained branded under that name until 2003 when the tournament name was changed to the Moorilla Hobart International. In 2014 the tournament was rebranded again as the Hobart International.

Redevelopment
Prior to the Australian Open changing its court surface, the tournament was played on Rebound Ace. When the Australian Open changed to Plexicushion in 2008, all Australian Open Series tournaments were required to change their court surfaces to Plexicushion. The Moorilla Hobart International, however, retained Rebound Ace. Tennis Australia announced that in order for Hobart to keep its tournament, it was required to make significant improvements to the facility, including resurfacing the courts to Plexicushion and improving the seating facilities. The Domain Tennis Centre resurfaced its hardcourts to Plexicushion in late 2008, in time for the 2009 tournament.

Midway through 2009, the Tasmanian Government announced a $2.25 million to fund redevelopments to the Domain Tennis Centre over 2009–10. This announcement was to ensure that the Moorilla Hobart International tournament was retained. Prior to the 2010 singles final, representatives from Tennis Australia, along with tournament director Michael Roberts, announced that the future of the tournament would be secured through to 2013.

In 2009, the Domain Tennis Centre began a series of redevelopments in order to ensure the tournament's future. The first stage of these redevelopments included the demolition of the northern seating to make way for a permanent Corporate Stand and also a new Media Stand at the southern end of the Centre Court. This was completed prior to the 2010 tournament. The second stage of the redevelopment is to construct new permanent grandstands at the eastern and western ends of the court, increasing seating from around 1000 spectators to 2800. The redevelopment was completed by the 2011 tournament.

Past finals

Singles

Doubles

See also
List of tennis tournaments

References

External links
Official website

 
Hard court tennis tournaments
WTA Tour
Tennis tournaments in Australia
Sport in Hobart